The Nandi Infrastructure Corridor Enterprises Road, commonly known as NICE Road, is a scrapped 4 to 6 lane private tolled expressway in Karnataka, that was intended to connect the two important cities Bengaluru and Mysuru in the Indian state of Karnataka but it will not be implemented as Bengaluru-Mysuru Expressway is going to replace it as the new Bengaluru-Mysuru Industrial Corridor(EC-34). 

As of May 2017, around 8,00,000 vehicles use the road daily, in its presently operation section starting from Electronic City ending at Tumkur Road.

History

In conjunction with a 1995 Trade Mission to India sponsored by the then Governor of Massachusetts, William Weld, a memorandum of understanding was signed by Consortium members, Indian officials, including then Karnataka Chief Minister, H.D. Deve Gowda, and U.S. officials, which set the stage for launching the Bangalore Mysore Infrastructure Corridor project. The Consortium, Nandi Infrastructure Corridor Enterprises (NICE), comprises the Kalyani Group of Companies, VHB International LTD. and SAB International LTD. to develop the Bangalore Mysore Infrastructure Corridor.

The project has been in controversy since the day of planning. In October 2012, the Karnataka Lokayukta ordered a probe into several former chief ministers in matters relating to irregularities in land acquisition for the project.

Once fully constructed, it is planned to go through Mysuru, Srirangapattana, Pandavapura, Mandya, Maddur, Channapattana, Ramanagara, Kengeri and Bengaluru. The presently completed part of NICE road consists of a half-circle around the city of Bangalore, starting from Electronic City Ending at Tumkur Road. It has access points at Electronic City , Bannergatta Road, Kanakapura Road, Mysore Road, Magadi Road and Tumkur Road

Status updates
 Mar 2019: 4 km of expressway is completed, besides this 41 km of peripheral road and 8.5 km of link road is also constructed.

Gallery

See also
 Bengaluru-Mysuru Expressway, an upcoming project.
 Expressways of India
 Infrastructure in Bangalore
 Outer Ring Road (Bangalore)
 Bangalore Elevated Tollway

References

External links
Bangalore Mysore Infrastructure Corridor Area Planning Authority

Transport in Bangalore
Transport in Mysore
Roads in Bangalore Rural district
Expressways in Karnataka
Toll roads in India
Roads in Bangalore Urban district
Roads in Mysore district
Roads in Ramanagara district
Roads in Mandya district